Rajini is an Indian Tamil-language family drama television series that airs on Zee Tamil and it digitally available on ZEE5. It premiered on 27 December 2021. The series stars Shreya Anchan in the titular role with Arun Crizer in the lead roles.

Synopsis 
Rajini, a determined and bold woman, who take cares her whole family as a single lady. But things take turns when her love was forgiving to her sister.

Cast

Main 
 Shreya Anchan as Rajini: a determined and bold woman, an IT employee; Ranjitham's 2nd daughter; Radhika, Murali and Divya's elder sister; Shankari's younger sister; Parthiban's wife; Aravind's ex-girlfriend (2021–present)
 Arun Crizer as Parthiban: Anitha's brother; Rajini's husband. (2022–present)

Recurring  
 Srilekha Parthasarathy as Ranjitham: Rajini, Radhika, Shankari, Murali and Divya's mother; Marimuthu's first wife. (2021–present)
 Poppy Master as Padma: Marimuthu's second wife, Meena's mother, Rajini's stepmother (2022–present)
 Andrews Jesudoss as Marimuthu: Ranjitham and Padma's husband; Rajini, Radhika, Shankari, Murali and Divya's father; Singamuthu's elder brother (2022–present)
 Subiksha Kayarohanam as Radhika; Aravind's wife; Rajini and Shankari's younger sister; Murali and Divya's elder sister; Ranjitham's 3rd daughter (Main Antagonist) (2021–present)
 Hemanth Kumar as Aravind: Rajini's ex-boyfriend; Radhika's husband (2021–present)
 Arifa Arafat as Siva Shankari: Rajini, Radhika, Murali and Divya's elder sister; Ranjitham's 1st daughter (2021–present)
 Vishwanth as Kuberan: Shankari's husband
 Rithieshvar Rajan / Tharun Appasamy as Murali: Aishwarya’s husband; Rajini, Radhika and Shankari's younger brother; Divya's elder brother; Ranjitham's son (2021–present) 
 Sinthuja Mu as Aishwarya: Murali’s wife
 Preetha Suresh as Divya: Anand's wife; Rajini, Radhika, Shankari and Murali's youngest sister; Ranjitham's 4th daughter (2021–present)
 Vishnukanth as Anand: Divya's husband; Rajini, Radhika, Shankari, Murali and Divya's maternal cousin; Ranjitham's elder nephew; Selvi and Rajasekhar's son (2021–present)
 Yalini Rajan as Anitha: Rajini's best friend since childhood; Parthiban's elder sister, Jerold's wife (2021–present)
 David Solomon Raja as Singamuthu: Rajini, Radhika, Shankari, Murali and Divya's younger paternal uncle; Marimuthu's younger brother (2021–present)
 Srividya Shankar as Selvi: Rajini, Radhika, Shankari, Murali and Divya's maternal aunt; Ranjitham's elder sister-in-law; Anand's mother; Rajasekhar's wife (2021–present)
 Geetha Ravishankar / Babitha Justin as Kamala, Parthiban Mother (2022-present)
 Ravishankar as Kaalimuthu, Parthiban Father (2022)
 Sai Rithu as Meena: Marimuthu and Padma's daughter (2022–present)
 Girija Hari as Nisha: Aravind's elder sister, Bhaskar's wife (2021–present)
 Manoj Kumar as Rajasekhar: Rajini, Radhika, Shankari, Murali and Divya's maternal uncle; Ranjitham's elder brother; Selvi's husband; Anand's father (2021–present)
 Sai Lakshmi as Kamakshi: Singamuthu's wife; Rajini, Radhika, Shankari, Murali and Divya's younger paternal aunt (2021–present)
 Maanas Chawla as Ramesh Sharma: Rajini's IT Manager (2022–present)
 Nalini as Azhagamma: Parthiban's aunt (2022–2023)
 Dharani as Hemalatha: Radhika's mother-in-law; Aravind and Nisha's mother (2021–present)
 Bala as Manoj: Radhika's father-in-law; Aravind and Nisha's father (2021–present)
 Sankavi Rajendran as Raghavi: Parthiban's ex-fiancée, fixed by Anitha (2022–present)
 Revathy Shankar as Anitha and Parthiban's mother (2022)
 Premi Venkat as Kavitha: Raghavi's aunt (2022)
 Babitha as Raghavi's mother (2022)
 Shravan Dwaraganath as Ragavi's father (2022)
 Vetrivel as Jerold: Rajini's colleague; Anitha's husband (2021–2022)

Cameo appearances
 VJ Parvathy as Sharanya

Special and Crossover episodes 
 The series held a one hour special episode on Sunday for the love proposal of Parthiban-Rajini on 15 May 2022 at 2pm.
 Rajini  with Anbe Sivam series held a one hour episodes of Super Sanagamam from 23 May to 6 June 2022.
 The series again held a one hour special episode on Sunday for the court scene on 17 July 2022 at 2pm.

References

External links
 
 Rajini at ZEE5

Zee Tamil original programming
Tamil-language romance television series
Tamil-language television soap operas
2021 Tamil-language television series debuts
Television shows set in Tamil Nadu
Television series about families